Christopher Castiglia (born May 14, 1960) is an American literary scholar and Distinguished Professor of English and Women's, Gender, and Sexuality Studies at the Pennsylvania State University.

References

Living people
American literary critics
Pennsylvania State University faculty
1960 births